The 2005 Dubai World Cup was a horse race held at Nad Al Sheba Racecourse on Saturday 26 March 2005. It was the 10th running of the Dubai World Cup.

The winner was Kenneth & Sarah Ramsey's Roses In May, a five-year-old brown horse trained in the United States by Dale Romans and ridden by John R. Velazquez. Roses In May's victory was the first in the race for his owner, trainer and jockey.

Roses In May had been one of the leading dirt performers in the United States in 2004 when he won the Whitney Stakes and finished second to Ghostzapper in the Breeders' Cup Classic. Before being shipped to Dubai he finished second to Saint Liam in the Donn Handicap in February. In the 2005 Dubai World Cup he started the 11/8 favourite and won by three lengths from his fellow American challenger Dynever, with Choctaw Nation one and a quarter lengths back in third. The Richard Mandella-trained second favourite Congrats finished fifth of the twelve runners.

Race details
 Sponsor: Emirates Airline
 Purse: £3,125,000; First prize: £1,875,000
 Surface: Dirt
 Going: Fast
 Distance: 10 furlongs
 Number of runners: 12
 Winner's time: 2:02.17

Full result

 Abbreviations: DSQ = disqualified; nse = nose; nk = neck; shd = head; hd = head
 King's Boy also raced under the name Qaayed Alkhail

Winner's details
Further details of the winner, Roses In May
 Sex: Stallion
 Foaled: 9 February 2000
 Country: United States
 Sire: Devil His Due; Dam: Tell A Secret (Speak John)
 Owner: Kenneth & Sarah Ramsey
 Breeder: Margaux Farm

References

Dubai World Cup
Dubai World Cup
Dubai World Cup
Dubai World Cup